Púchov Zimny Arena is an indoor ice hockey venue in Púchov, Slovakia.

The arena has a capacity of 1,400 people, and is the home arena of HK Orange 20.

References

Indoor ice hockey venues in Slovakia
Buildings and structures in Trenčín Region
Sport in Trenčín Region